Fletch may refer to:

 Fletch (archery), the individual materials, such as feathers, that provide aerodynamic stabilization in arrows or darts
 Adrian "Fletch" Fletcher, a fictional character in British medical dramas Casualty and Holby City
 Andy Fletcher (musician), nicknamed "Fletch", a member of the band Depeche Mode
 Fletch (novel), the first book in a series of books by Gregory Mcdonald featuring the character Irwin Maurice Fletcher
 Fletch (film), a 1985 comedy starring Chevy Chase, based on the novel
 Fletch (Hollyoaks), a fictional character from British soap opera Hollyoaks
 Norman Stanley Fletcher, nicknamed "Fletch", the lead character in the British sit-com Porridge
 Fletch & Vaughan, the weekday drive show of New Zealand's The Edge radio station with co-host Carl "Fletch" Fletcher
A nickname given to a person whose surname is Fletcher

See also
Fletcher (disambiguation)